Jericho is an unincorporated community in Perry County, Alabama, United States.

History
A post office operated under the name Jericho from 1836 to 1907. At one point, Jericho was home to at least one sawmill and three gristmills.

References

Unincorporated communities in Perry County, Alabama
Unincorporated communities in Alabama